The Teles Pires is a  long river in Brazil. The river flows through the state of Mato Grosso and its lower part marks the border between the states of Mato Grosso and Pará. At its mouth it joins Juruena River and together they form the Tapajós, which is one of the biggest tributaries of the Amazon River. The most important settlement along the river is Alta Floresta. One writer says that it was originally called the Paranatinga, and was renamed after Captain Telles Pires who died exploring the river in 1889.

Several dams are planned on the river in the "Hidrovia Tapajos/Teles Pires" project to create a navigable waterway connecting the interior of Brazil to the Atlantic Ocean.  
The waterway will consist of five dams on the Teles Pires river ( Magessi Dam,  Sinop Dam,  Colíder Dam,  Teles Pires Dam,  Sao Manoel Dam) and the  Foz do Apiacas Dam on the Apiacas river.

The Colíder Dam and the Teles Pires Dam are currently under construction, while the smaller upstream dams are still in the planning stages.

References

External links

Teles Pires in the American Heritage Dictionary of the English (bartleby.com) (outdated length)
Hidrovia Tapajos - Teles Pires - Regierungsdokument (portuguese)

Rivers of Mato Grosso
Rivers of Pará